Oswald Albert Mitchell (1890 - April 27, 1949) was a British film director who directed several of the Old Mother Riley series of films.

Selected filmography
 The Guns of Loos (1928, producer)
 Such Is the Law (1930, producer)
 Danny Boy (1934)
Cock o' The North (1935)
 King of Hearts (1936)
 Love Up the Pole (1936, producer)
 Variety Parade (1936)
 Old Mother Riley (1937)
 Lily of Laguna (1938)
Night Journey (1938 film)
Little Dolly Daydream (1938)
 Almost a Gentleman (1938)
 Old Mother Riley in Paris (1938)
Music Hall Parade (1939)
 Old Mother Riley, MP (1939)
 Pack Up Your Troubles (1940)
 Sailors Don't Care (1940)
 Jailbirds (1940)
 Danny Boy (1941)
 Bob's Your Uncle (1942)
 Asking for Trouble (1942)
 Old Mother Riley Overseas (1943)
 Old Mother Riley at Home (1945)
 Loyal Heart (1946)
 The Mysterious Mr. Nicholson (1947)
 Black Memory (1947)
 The Greed of William Hart (1948)
 House of Darkness (1948)
 The Temptress (1949)
 The Man from Yesterday (1949)

References

External links

1890 births
1949 deaths
British film directors
People from Swansea